Evan Whildin was an American businessman in the firearms industry; a former Bureau of Alcohol, Tobacco, and Firearms agent; and a firearms cartridge designer. He was vice president and general manager of Philadelphia's Action Arms firearms company, and while working for them developed the .50 AE cartridge (famous in the Desert Eagle pistol) in 1988, and the 9mm AE (1988) and .41 AE (1986) cartridges.

References

Firearm designers

Possibly living people
Year of birth missing